Wenlou Tang bao is a large tangbao (baozi with soup filling) served in Wenlou, Huai'an, Jiangsu, China. The local residents also call it crab roe tangbao. It is a dish in Huaiyang cuisine.

Brief introduction
Wenlou Tang bao originated during the reign of the Daoguang Emperor in the Qing dynasty. It has three exquisite features. First, it is very big and its wrapper is extremely thin and looks like paper. Second, the stuffing is mixed with many materials such as meat, chicken, crab-roe, shrimps, etc. Third, it is the unique process. The soup stuffing should be solidified, put into the wrapper and steamed finally.

History
Wenlou was set up in Chuzhou District in 1828 where the literators and scholars always gathered in the past. Standing on it, you can appreciate the beautiful view. So it got the name Wenlou. At the beginning, Wenlou did not sell Tang bao. It acted as a teahouse and sold a few foods. In autumn, when crabs spring up on the market, Wenlou will supply the crab-roe tang bao. It is said that the Daoguang Emperor awarded Wenlou Tang bao the title “the most fresh in China” after he tasted it. It also left a deep impression on former Chinese Premier Zhou Enlai. In 1964, when Zhou received the leaders of Huai'an, he asked the business of Wenlou Tang bao. According to the report of local media, Wenlou Tang bao was identified as "Famous snakes in China" by China Cuisine Association in 1997. In 2002, Wenlou Tang bao registered the patent.

References

External links
http://vip.book.sina.com.cn/book/chapter_169975_110565.html
http://www.17u.com/blog/article/59891.html
http://saa.auto.sohu.com/sh/thread-9519539722129-1.shtml

Jiangsu cuisine